Mount Finkol includes the highest point on the  island of Kosrae in the Federated States of Micronesia. It rises to a height of 2064 ft (619 m).

References
Bendure, G. & Friary, N. (1988) Micronesia:A travel survival kit. South Yarra, VIC: Lonely Planet.

Kosrae
Mountains of the Federated States of Micronesia